Solo Concerts: Bremen/Lausanne is a recording released through ECM by jazz pianist Keith Jarrett performing solo improvisations recorded in Bremen (Germany, July) and Lausanne (Switzerland, March) in 1973; in between, Jarrett played in the US with his American quartet. Originally released as a 3-LP album, it was the first of Jarrett's live solo performances to be released on ECM, following his studio-based debut solo recording Facing You (1971), and preceding his record-breaking Köln Concert (1975).

Critical reception
In 1974, DownBeat ranked the album as the best jazz recording of the year

The Allmusic review by Scott Yanow awarded the album 5 stars, stating, "Despite the length, the music never loses one's interest, making this an essential recording for all jazz collections". Ted Gioia calls it Jarrett's "masterpiece", "two titanic improvised performances".

According to Mikal Gilmore in Night Beat, "with Bremen-Lausanne and the subsequent Köln Concert, Jarrett found his niche, freely mixing gospel, impressionist, and atonal flights into a consonant whole". Bill Dobbins notes that the (short) encore on the third side, a boogie-woogie inflected ostinato, owes much to Duke Ellington's New World A-Comin.

Writing for the now defunct jazz magazine Jazz.com, in December 2007 Ted Gioia rated 100/100 the track Bremen, Germany, July 12, 1973, Part I stating that:

Track listing 
Vinyl pressing

CD pressing

Recorded in concert in Bremen on July 12, and in Lausanne on March 20, 1973.

Personnel
 Keith Jarrett – piano

Production
 Manfred Eicher and Keith Jarrett - producer
 Pierre Grandjean - recording engineer (Lausanne)
 Alan Kobel - recording engineer (Lausanne)
 Rolf Rockstroh - recording engineer (Bremen)
 Kurt Rapp, Martin Wieland - remix engineers
 Roberto Masotti, A. Raggenbass, Jochen Mönch - photography
 Barbara and Burkhart Wojirsch - cover design and layout

References 

Keith Jarrett live albums
1973 live albums
ECM Records live albums
Albums produced by Manfred Eicher
Instrumental albums
Solo piano jazz albums